Sampooranathevan is a mythical figure found in Ayyavazhi mythology. He was considered a powerful Deva of Deiva Loga. In Kali Yuga, He was born, and became known in history as Mudisoodum Perumal or Muthukutty.

The exact date of birth of Mudisoodum Perumal or Muthukutty is unknown. It is mostly placed in either 1810 or 1809, while others follow the view of Akilam.

Para Devathai 

Sampooranathevan of Deiva Loga and Paradevathai of Yama Loga had fallen in love. So, when Sampooranathevan asked Thirumal to be granted birth into the world, he requested the same be given to his lover. Paradevathai earlier had been married to a man of Yama Loga, but since had left him.

Thirumal refused, asserting that Para Devathai was already a wife, and that Sampooranathevan was from Deiva loga and she was from Yama Loga (a class difference). Thirumal stated that Sampooranathevan's physical birth would be great but hers would not, so Sampooranathevan's was wrong, encouraging Sampooranathevan to drop the matter. However Sampooranathevan replied, "Your Highness, only at the most lovable place does the Ultimate love (love towards God) begin and not at a random place. [Implying that his love was of divine origin.]  Isn't that true? So, please fulfill my desire. Also, I promise to you, I will be most affectionate to her." [bracket added by editors] So Thirumal allowed them to perform austrity, to take birth united and sublime.

Failure of Tavam 

Sampooranathevan and Para Devathai began performing austrity. When their tavam was close to an end, they saw Indra going that way. Until then their tapas had not met with any problem. But on seeing Indra a desire originated in the mind of Sampooranathevan. He asked Paradevathai, " My dear, it will be fine if you and I, with the crown of Indra, rule the world." Paradevathai replied: "Fine dear, but even if Brahma created us like that, may it be eternal." She was pointing out to him his libidinious enjoyment.

Meanwhile, in Kailai, Sivan and Thirumal were discussing how to destroy Kali, after sending Lakshmi to grow as magaram in the sea, to give birth to a child for destroying Kali (She was also asked to perform austrity in the sea). Thirumal told him about Sampooranathevan and Paradevathai and about their tavam. He also said that it was time for the closure of their tavam and time to offer birth to them, and he suggested that they all go together to them. Thirumal and Sivan came to see the tavam. On seeing them Sampooranathevan and Paradevathai welcomed and praised them.

At the very first moment of seeing them, Sivan told Thirumal that their tavam met with failure, as they had desired the crown of Indra. On hearing this Thirumal asked Sampooranathevan to illustrate. But he wondered : "I only speak of my thought with my lady with my eyes. We only communicate from mind to mind. Your greatness, How were you able to sense that." In saying this he fell on the feet of Sivan and Thirumal and asked them to excuse the misdeed. Paradevathai too cried for their rescue. They still implored Sivan and Thirumal to unite them.

Birth of Paradevathai 

On seeing this Thirumal told Paradevathai that since your austrity met with failure, and because of your previous husband's sufferings due to your separation, you will be born in the world in Yamakulam and will be married to your husband of Yama Lokam. You will suffer there. You will fall ill and live without any happiness. You will not have any bodily relations with him. But still you will do all your duties to him as per the karma. At that time Sampooranathevan will be born in the world in Devakulam and will lead a joyful life in the world. Due to your previous intimacy you two will meet each other and will fall in love with each other. You will not take care of God, your father, mother, or relations, and you will consider Sampooranathevan as your husband. You will suffer due to your defamation by others. Then you will seek supreme bliss and will realise (the Ultimate real truth) God and you will be granted moksha. By saying this she was born in the world.

Acceptance of Sampooranathevan 

Thirumal told Sampooranathevan that his request for Paradevathai's birth had been granted. Sampooranathevan praised them and also requested that they pardon his sin (desiring the crown of Indra). Mayon replied that, she, Paradevathai, fell in love with you even though her husband was alive. That is a sin. You performed tavam to purify her. It too failed. So you too must be born in the world and suffer like her. There, due to your deep love for her, your mind will tend to commit suicide without unifying with her. You and Paradevathai will live as husband and wife. At that time I will come and take you and transform you and give you birth as my son. And by you, I will wipe out my sorrows due to the sufferings of The Santror.

Sampooranathevan replied: "Your greatness, I was asked to be born in the world which is full of evil and sorrows. I request that you create me in the primitive Santror race. I also request that you save not only me but also the santror makkal among whom I am going to be born. And he asked Thirumal to say when he would go into the world to rescue him. Thirumal replied that he would be created in the world in the Santror race in Devakulam, and he pointed out some events which would take place in the world at the time of his arrival. Then Sampooranathevan praised Sivan and Thirumal and was born."

Birth of Sampooranathevan 

The year as well as the exact date of birth of Sampooranathevan is a matter of conflict. Various historians place the year of birth as 1809 C.E while as few other sources placed his birth in 1808 C.E. The soul of Sampooranathevan was to be given birth in the world in a human body. Historians predict various dates from 12 March to 19 April. He has born as the second son to Ponnumadan - Kakaachi (also known as Veyilai) couple. The child was given birth by Kakachi, wife of Ponnu Nadar. This child grew and became known in history as Muthukutty.

Life of Sampooranathevan 

Sampooranathevan also known as Muthukutty was born in 1809 to Ponnu Nadar and Veyilal Amma at Poovandanthope in the Kanyakumari District (part of Travancore then). They initially named the child Mudisoodum Perumal, meaning "Lord with a crown". But the people complained to authorities about the name and they forced the parents to change his name to Muthukutty.

The boy was initially named Mudisoodum perumal, but due to the pressure from higher castes the name was changed to Muthukutty. He started his life as a palm climber. He met Paradevathi and lived like a husband with his wife. Paradevathi soon gave birth to a son, but it was claimed that her first husband was the father. Akilam does not say anything about any birth.

Muthukutty was a religious boy who had special interest in Lord Vishnu. The holy book Akilathirattu mentions that he set a pedestal for Lord Vishnu in his house. At age of seventeen, Muthukutty started to live with Thirumalammal from the nearby village of Puviyur and she lived with him only to serve him during his public activities. Thirumalammal had been married, but left her former husband to marry Muthukutty. According to quotes found in Akilathirattu, they had a male child, who was sired by her first husband. Muthukutty earned his living as a Palmyra palm climber and as an agricultural laborer.

At the age of 17 he married [30] a woman Thirumalammal of Puviyoor, Agastheeswaram, who was left alone by her husband. There is also a view that they never get married and that the women only came to serve him in his activities. He continued his early life as a Palmyra Climber and as an Agricultural labourer. At the age of 22 he fall ill.

There is another narrative that at his age of 16, the upper classes, being irritated by the inclusionary views and activities of Vaikundar and his popularity, made several attempts to eliminate him and all of them failed. So they eventually conspired to kill him in by clandestine means. They pretend to be get convinced to his view and pretend to celebrate him and his preachings. They invited him for a banquet at Marunthuvazh Malai. He was served with poison through food. 

Muthukutty in his twenty-fourth year, he was struck by illness and suffered for a year.  At this time, and in a dream of his mother Lord Narayana asked her to take her son to Thiruchendur temple. His mother took her sick son to the temple at Thiruchendur, during a festival there. He went into the sea and disappeared. The parents searched for his body for one day. According to the legend, the day itself inside the sea Muthukutty also known as Sampooranathevan was granted moksha by Lord Narayana.

See also 
Ayyavazhi mythology
Akilathirattu Ammanai

References

 N. Elango and Vijaya Shanthi Elango 1997, Ayya Vaikuntar - The Light of the World.
 G. Patrick, Religion and Subaltern Agency, 2003, University of Madras.
 Akilathirattu Ammanai published by P. Thangaiyah Nadar, 1989.
"Holy Akilathirattu", R. Hari Gopalan Citar, Thenthamarikualam, 10 December 1841, First Publication 1939
"Holy Akilathirattu Scripture", R. Gopalakrishnan, Chennai, First Publication 2019, Published by Akilathirattu India Mission

External links 
Dawn of Lord Vaikuntar
Life History of Lord Vaikundar

Ayyavazhi mythical figures